Jeux sans frontières was a Europe-wide television game show. The 1995 edition was won by the team from Brno in the Czech Republic.

Participating countries

Heats

Heat 1 - Milan, Italy

Heat 2 - Brno, Czech Republic

Heat 3 - Milan, Italy

Heat 4 - Vilamoura, Portugal

Heat 5 - Milan, Italy

Heat 6 - Athens, Greece

Heat 7 - Budapest, Hungary

Heat 8 - San Ġiljan, Malta

Heat 9 - Vilamoura, Portugal

Heat 10 - Athens, Greece

Final 
The final round was held in Budapest in Hungary

Qualified teams 
The teams which qualified from each country to the final were:

Final table 

Jeux sans frontières
1995 television seasons
Television game shows with incorrect disambiguation